Eferiokose Ukala popularly known as Efe is a Nigerian lawyer, women empowerment advocate and philanthropist. Ukala is the founder of ImpactHER, a nonprofit organization training, empowering and   connecting African women entrepreneurs with foreign investors. She currently serves as vice president and assistant general counsel on institutional investors at JPMorgan Chase. In 2022, she was listed in the African Forty Under 40 for her economic empowerment of women across Africa and appeared in the Global Heroes Women Role Model List of 100 women executives.

Education and career 
Ukala studied for her International Baccalaureate (IB) diploma at the British School of Lome in 2000 and artium baccalaureus (AB) degree at University of Chicago. She earned her J.D. from Washington and Lee University School of Law. She is a member of New Jersey and New York states Bar.

She was vice president legal and Compliance at Kuramo Capital Management before moving to JPMorgan Chase & Co serving as vice president and assistant general counsel on institutional investors.

She founded ImpactHER, a nonprofit organisation in 2017. The organisation empowers African women entrepreneurs with business advisory, digital skills, provides seed capital and connects them to foreign investors. Her organization has sourced over two million dollars in institutional capital from investors and awarded over 40,000 African women five thousand dollars seed capital each. The organization was commended by African Union in 2022 for its impact.

References 

20th-century Nigerian lawyers
Nigerian philanthropists
Nigerian women lawyers
JPMorgan Chase employees
JPMorgan Chase people
Year of birth missing (living people)
Living people